Glycine-N-acyltransferase like 2 is a protein that in humans is encoded by the GLYATL2 gene.

References

Further reading